Coombe Hill Wood is a  local nature reserve in Coombe in the Royal Borough of Kingston upon Thames in London. It is owned and managed by Kingston Council, and was declared a local nature reserve in 1992.

The site is ancient woodland, with oaks and an understorey of hazel. It is located between Robin Hood Way (A3 road) and Henley Drive.

References

Nature reserves in the Royal Borough of Kingston upon Thames
Local nature reserves in Greater London